Nicky Lee Featherstone (born 22 September 1988) is an English professional footballer who plays as midfielder for  club Hartlepool United.

He is also capable of playing as a winger and has previously played for Hull City, Grimsby Town, Hereford United, Walsall, Scunthorpe United and Harrogate Town.

Career

Hull City
Born in Goole, Humberside, Featherstone came through Hull City's youth structure. He joined the Centre of Excellence at the age of eight and, along with Will Atkinson, James Bennett and Matty Plummer, penned a two-and-a-half-year professional deal with the club in December 2006. After starring for the youth and reserve teams, he made his first team debut against Burnley on 30 December 2006, coming on as a late substitute. He was one of the nominees for the 'Wickes Young Apprentice Trophy' in 2007.

In September 2007 he signed a new contract to keep him at the club until June 2010, after a clause in his old contract stated that he would be offered a new one after making five first team appearances.

During the 2007–08 season, Featherstone featured as a second-half substitute for Hull City against Chelsea in the third round of the League Cup. He played in the third round tie in the 2009–10 League Cup against Southend United.

On 19 November 2009 Featherstone joined League Two outfit Grimsby Town on an initial month's loan. He made his debut in a 0–0 draw with Lincoln City on 21 November. He eventually made seven appearances for Grimsby, and eventually returned to Hull on 3 January 2010. He re-signed for Grimsby for a second loan spell on 11 January 2010. On 1 February 2010, Featherstone returned to Hull early having asked to have his loan contract cut short, down to the fact he had fallen out of contention at Grimsby, having made only one appearance for The Mariners in his second loan spell.

During the 2010–11 season, despite being kept on at the club, Featherstone did not receive a squad number and eventually departed the club permanently in January 2011.

Hereford United
Featherstone joined League Two side Hereford United on an initial one-month loan on 4 November and signed a permanent deal to stay at Edgar Street in January. In May 2011 he signed a new one-year contract with the club.
Following the conclusion of the 2011–12 season which saw Hereford relegated to the Conference National division, Featherstone seemingly departed United having failed to respond to the club's offer of a new contract.

Walsall
Featherstone signed with Football League One side Walsall on a one-year deal. He signed with The Saddlers on 6 August after impressing on trial with the West Midlands club.

Scunthorpe United
On 19 August 2014, it was announced that Featherstone had joined Football League One side Scunthorpe United on a "week to week" deal. He left the club on 2 September after his non-contract terms were cancelled.

Harrogate Town
On 3 October 2014, it was announced that Featherstone had joined Conference North side Harrogate Town.

Hartlepool United
On 31 October 2014, Featherstone returned to the Football League by signing with Hartlepool United on a short-term deal. The following day, Featherstone made his debut in a 2–2 draw with Newport County. On 2 February 2015, Featherstone extended his contract until the end of the season. On 25 June 2015, Featherstone signed a new deal with Hartlepool. On 27 August 2016, he scored his first goal for Hartlepool in another 2–2 draw with Newport County. On 7 March 2020, he made his 250th appearance for Hartlepool in a 0–1 defeat to Ebbsfleet United. Featherstone signed a new contract at the end of the 2019–20 season after an impressive campaign. 

In the 2020–21 campaign, Featherstone played an integral role in central midfield and formed a strong relationship with Mark Shelton and Gavan Holohan in midfield as Hartlepool qualified for the play-offs in 4th place. In the play-off eliminator against Bromley, Featherstone played an excellent long ball through to Rhys Oates to open the scoring for Pools in a 3–2 win. In the 2021 National League play-off Final, Featherstone started in the final but missed a penalty in the shootout. However, Hartlepool prevailed 5–4 on penalties and were promoted back to the Football League. Featherstone lifted the play-off trophy alongside club captain Ryan Donaldson. Following Hartlepool's promotion back to League Two, Featherstone was announced as Hartlepool's new club captain and signed a new two year contract. 

In the 2022–23 season, he moved into the top ten most appearances list for Hartlepool United.

Career statistics

Honours
Hartlepool United
National League play-offs: 2021

References

External links
Nicky Featherstone profile at the Hull City website

1988 births
Living people
People from Goole
English footballers
Association football midfielders
Hull City A.F.C. players
Grimsby Town F.C. players
Hereford United F.C. players
Walsall F.C. players
Scunthorpe United F.C. players
Harrogate Town A.F.C. players
Hartlepool United F.C. players
English Football League players
National League (English football) players